Baranomys loczyi is an extinct species of rodent from the Baranomys genus, from the Baranomyinae subfamily of Cricetidae family. It lived in Pliocene epoch and was an ancestor to modern Arvicolinae. The species was first described by Theodor Kormos in 1933.

References 

Cricetidae
Pliocene mammals
Prehistoric rodents
Animals described in 1933